Caribbean Spanish is the general name of the Spanish dialects spoken in the Caribbean region. The Spanish language was introduced to the Caribbean in 1492 with the voyages of Christopher Columbus. It resembles the Spanish spoken in the Canary Islands, and, more distantly, the Spanish of western Andalusia.

More precisely, the term in its strictest sense however refers to the Spanish language as it is spoken on the Caribbean island nations of Cuba, the Dominican Republic, and Puerto Rico. In a much looser sense, it can also include the Caribbean coasts of Panama, Colombia, and Venezuela, and on the widest application of the phrase, it includes the Caribbean coastal regions of Mexico, Guatemala, Belize, Honduras, Nicaragua, and Costa Rica.

Phonology 
It may also be elided entirely. Syllable-final  is always or mostly pronounced in formal speech, like TV broadcasts. 
 Syllable-initial  is also sporadically debuccalized, although this process is documented only in certain areas, such as parts of Puerto Rico: cinco centavos ,  la semana pasada .
 As a reaction to the stigmatization of s-debuccalization and elision, hypercorrections are frequent. For example, speakers may say  for  '14 years'. These hypercorrections are called  'speaking finely', with an extra, hypercorrect 's'.
  pronounced , as is common in Andalusia, the Canary islands and various parts of South America.
 Word-final  is realized as a velar nasal  (velarization). It can be elided, with backwards nasalization of the preceding vowel: →; as in part of Andalusia.
 Deletion of intervocalic and word final , as in many Spanish dialects: cansado  ('tired'), nada → ('nothing'), and perdido  ('lost'), mitad →
 Syllable final 'r' has a variety of realisations:
 lambdacism → porque →
 deletion of  hablar →
 assimilation to following consonant, causing gemination. carne →, →. Most notable of Spanish spoken in and around Havana.
  is a common realization in the middle and upper classes in Puerto Rico under the influence of English.
 aspiration → carne →
  is devoiced to [] in the Dominican Republic and Puerto Rico: cotorra → and realised as a uvular fricative ,  (uvularization) in rural Puerto Rican dialects 
 Several neutralizations also occur in the syllable coda. The deletions and neutralizations (→→→) show variability in their occurrence, even with the same speaker in the same utterance, which implies that nondeleted forms exist in the underlying structure. That is not to say that these dialects are on the path to eliminating coda consonants since such processes have existed for more than four centuries in these dialects.   argues that it is the result of speakers acquiring multiple phonological systems with uneven control, like that of second language learners.
Examples of Cuban Spanish:

Morphology
 As in all American variants of Spanish the third person plural pronoun  has supplanted the pronoun .
  is now completely absent from insular Caribbean Spanish. Contemporary commentators such as the Cuban Esteban Pichardo speak of its survival as late as the 1830s (see López Morales 1970:136‑142) but by the 1870s it appears to have become confined to a small number of speakers from the lowest social strata.  In the north west of Venezuela, in the states of Falcon and Zulia, in the north of the Cesar department, in the south of La Guajira department on Colombia's Atlantic coast and the Azurero Peninsula in Panama  is still used.
 The diminutive (ito, ita) takes the form (ico, ica) after : , . BUT .
 Possibly as a result of the routine elision of word-final , some speakers may use  as a plural marker, but generally this tendency is limited to words with singular forms that end in a stressed vowel:   ‘coffee’ →  ‘coffees’,   ‘sofa’ →  ‘sofas’.

Vocabulary

 The second-person subject pronouns, tú (or vos in Central America) and usted, are used more frequently than in other varieties of Spanish, contrary to the general Spanish tendency to omit them when meaning is clear from the context (see pro-drop language). Thus, tú estás hablando instead of estás hablando. The tendency is strongest in the island countries and, on the mainland, in Nicaragua, where voseo (rather than the use of tú for the second person singular familiar) is predominant.
 So-called "wh-questions", which in standard Spanish are marked by subject/verb inversion, often appear without the inversion in Caribbean Spanish: "¿Qué tú quieres?" for standard "¿Qué quieres (tú)?" ("What do you want?").

See also

 Andalusian Spanish
 Belizean Spanish
 Canarian Spanish
 Colombian Spanish
 Costa Rica
 Cuban Spanish
 Dominican Spanish
 Guatemalan Spanish
 Honduran Spanish
 Mexican Spanish
 Nicaraguan Spanish
 Panamanian Spanish
 Puerto Rican Spanish
 Venezuelan Spanish
 Languages of the Caribbean
Isleño Spanish

References

Bibliography

 25, 465-497.

Further reading

 
Spanish
Spanish dialects of North America
Spanish-Caribbean culture
Spanish West Indies